The coyote is a species of canine found throughout North and Central America.

Coyote or El Coyote may also refer to:

Mythology
 Coyote (mythology), trickster spirit of many indigenous cultures of North America
 Coyote (Navajo mythology)

Geography
 Coyote, California, an unincorporated community
 Coyote, Lincoln County, New Mexico, an unincorporated community
 Coyote, Rio Arriba County, New Mexico, a census-designated place
 Coyote Buttes, Utah and Arizona
 Coyote Creek (disambiguation)
 Coyote Dam (Santa Clara County, California)
 Coyote Gold Mine, in the remote Tanami Desert of Australia
 Coyote Hills (disambiguation)
 Coyote Lake (disambiguation)
 Coyote Mountain (disambiguation)
 Coyote Mountains (Arizona)
 Coyote Mountains, California
 Coyote Valley, California
 Coyote Valley, Colorado (Kawuneeche Valley)
 Rancho Los Coyotes, an 1834 Mexican land grant

People
 Coyote (person), a person who smuggles people illegally into the US from Mexico
 Coyote (racial category), in colonial Mexico, a person with Amerindian and Spanish ancestry
 Alberto Coyote (born 1967), Mexican football player
 Ivan Coyote (born 1969), Canadian spoken word performer and writer
 Peter Coyote (born 1941), American actor
 Coyote Peterson (born 1981), American YouTuber and wildlife educator
 Coyote Shivers (born 1965), Canadian musician and actor
 El Coyote (singer), Mexican singer José Angel Ledezma Quintero (born 1970)

Arts and entertainment

Fictional characters
 Coyote, a character in the TV series Gargoyles
 Coyote, a character in the webcomic Gunnerkrigg Court
 Calamity Coyote, a cartoon character in the TV series Tiny Toon Adventures
 Coyote Bergstein, a character in the TV series Grace and Frankie
 El Coyote (fictional character), a Zorro-like character created by José Mallorquí
 Tech E. Coyote, a cartoon character
 Wile E. Coyote, a cartoon character
 Coyote Stark, a character in the anime and manga Bleach

Films
 The Coyote (1955 film), a Mexican-Spanish western film
 Coyote (1992 film), a Canadian-French film
 Coyote (2007 film), an independent film
 Coyote (2017 film), a biography of the sailor Mike Plant
 Coyote (2022 film), a Canadian drama film directed by Katherine Jerkovic

In print
Coyotes (book), a 1987 nonfiction book on Mexican migrant workers
 Coyote (comics), a comic book series by Steve Englehart
 Coyote (novel), a 2002 science fiction novel by Allen Steele
 Coyote, a manga by Kouta Hirano
 Coyote, a 1990 mystery novel by Linda Barnes

Other arts and entertainment
 Coyote (TV series), an American drama TV series
 Coyote: I Like America and America Likes Me, 1974 performance by Joseph Beuys

Music

Albums
 Coyote (Kayo Dot album) (2010)
 Coyote (Matt Mays album) (2012)

Songs
 "Coyote" (song), from the 1976 Joni Mitchell album Hejira
 "Coyote", a song from the 1989 album Water in Time and Space by Susumu Hirasawa
 "Coyote", a song from the 1993 album Deluxe (Better Than Ezra album) by Better Than Ezra
 "Coyote", a song from the 2002 album The Ragpicker's Dream by Mark Knopfler
"Coyote", a song by Country Joe McDonald
 "Coyotes" (song), an American Western song by Bob McDill
 "Coyotes", a song from We Sing, We Dance, We Steal Things by Jason Mraz
 "El Coyote", a song from My Favorite Picture of You by Guy Clark

Radio stations
 KCLQ, licensed to Lebanon, Missouri, branded as 107.9 FM The Coyote
 KCYE, licensed to serve Meadview, Arizona, branded as 107.9 Coyote Country
 KIOT, licensed to Los Lunas, New Mexico, branded as Coyote 102.5 FM
 KLQB, licensed to Austin, Texas, at one time branded as KOYT 104.3 FM The Coyote
 KVGS, in Boulder City, Nevada, formerly branded as 102.7 FM The Coyote
 WCYO, licensed to Irvine, Kentucky, branded as 100.7 FM The Coyote
 WYOT, licensed to Rochelle, Illinois, branded as 102.3 FM The Coyote

Military
 Coyote Reconnaissance Vehicle, used by the Canadian Armed Forces
 Coyote Tactical Support Vehicle, used by the United Kingdom Armed Forces
 GQM-163 Coyote, a United States Navy target drone
 HMLA-775, a United States Marine Corps helicopter squadron known as the Coyotes
 Raytheon Coyote, a small, expendable, unmanned aircraft system
 USS Coyote (SP-84), United States Navy patrol craft, training vessel, and supply boat
 Coyote brown is a color, often used in military camouflage

Sports

Teams
 Alliston Coyotes, a Canadian Junior A ice hockey team in Ontario
 Arizona Coyotes, a National Hockey League team
 Cal State San Bernardino Coyotes, the athletics teams of Cal State University, San Bernardino
 Canton Coyotes, a former minor league baseball team from Ohio
 Central Valley Coyotes, a defunct arena football team from California
 Connecticut Coyotes, a former arena football team from Connecticut
 Edinburg Roadrunners, a defunct independent baseball team from Texas, known as the Edinburg Coyotes from 2006 to 2008
 Kansas Wesleyan Coyotes, the athletics teams of Kansas Wesleyan University
 Las Vegas Coyotes, a former inline hockey team
 Osoyoos Coyotes, a Canadian Junior B ice hockey team in British Columbia
 Palm Desert Coyotes, a possibly defunct independent baseball team from Palm Springs, California
 South Dakota Coyotes, the University of South Dakota athletics teams
 Thetford Mines Coyotes, former name of the Thetford Mines Isothermic, a Canadian ice hockey team in Quebec

Other sports uses
 Los Coyotes LPGA Classic, an LPGA golf tournament from 1989 to 1992
 The Coyote (mascot), mascot of the National Basketball Association team San Antonio Spurs

Transportation

Air
 Advanced Aviation Coyote
 Rans S-4 Coyote
 Rans S-5 Coyote
 Rans S-6 Coyote II

Land
 Coyote (automobile), American automobile built from 1909 to 1910
 Coyote (chassis), a brand of car chassis used by A. J. Foyt's race team
 5.0 L Coyote, a version of the Ford Modular engine

Other uses
 Coyote Logistics, a third-party logistics provider company and a subsidiary of UPS
 Coyote Building, Chicago
 Coyotes (book), a 1987 nonfiction book about Mexican migrant workers
 Coyote (Apache), an HTTP connector built into the Apache Tomcat Web container
 Call Off Your Old Tired Ethics (COYOTE), a sex workers' rights organization

See also
 Eugene Little Coyote, president of the Northern Cheyenne Indian Reservation
 Koyote, South Korean pop group